Fashion Valley Transit Center is an elevated station on the Green Line of the San Diego Trolley system. It is located at the southwest corner of the Fashion Valley Mall, after which the station is named. Below the station platform is a large bus plaza served by several MTS bus routes. The station has a 63 space park and ride lot.

This station opened on November 23, 1997 as part of the Blue Line Mission Valley Line extension to Mission San Diego station. Blue Line service to this station was replaced by the Green Line on July 10, 2005 as part of the Mission Valley East extension. Before the opening of the Mission Valley East extension, this station was rebuilt to raise the platform to accommodate the new low-floor trolley vehicles, giving passengers level access to trains without using steps or a wheelchair lift.

Station layout
There are two tracks, each served by a side platform.

References

External links
 Fashion Valley

Green Line (San Diego Trolley)
San Diego Trolley stations in San Diego
Mission Valley, San Diego
Railway stations in the United States opened in 1997
1997 establishments in California